The .45 Auto Rim, also known as 11.5x23mmR, is a rimmed cartridge specifically designed to be fired in revolvers originally chambered for the .45 ACP cartridge.

The Peters Cartridge Company developed the cartridge in 1920 for use in the M1917 revolver, large numbers of which had become available as surplus following the end of World War I.

Two issues related to the use of .45 ACP ammunition in the M1917 revolver led to the development of the .45 Auto Rim. The M1917 had previously been used with half-moon clips that held three rounds of .45 ACP, a rimless cartridge. But if half-moon or moon clips are not used when firing a rimless cartridge in a revolver, the spent cases must be ejected by hand—either by shaking the revolver and its swing-out cylinder or by poking the cases with a rod or field-expedient tool, like a pencil—as the revolver's extractor cannot grab them. The second issue concerned headspace. In revolver cylinders not engineered to allow .45 ACP to headspace properly, as in early production Colt M1917s, the cartridges could slip forward, stopping them from firing. Adding a rim to the .45 ACP cartridge solved both these issues.

Loads offered were similar to the standard military loads for the .45ACP, but with fully lead bullets rather than the full metal jacket bullets used for .45ACP. This was done to reduce barrel wear in the shallow rifled revolvers in which it was to be used.

The round is currently still in production by Corbon in their DPX and Performance Match lines of ammunition and is also manufactured by Georgia Arms and Buffalo Bore Ammunition.

References 

Pistol and rifle cartridges
Rimmed cartridges